William Joseph Mauro  (born ) is a Canadian politician in Ontario, Canada. He served as the mayor of Thunder Bay, Ontario from 2018 to 2022. He was previously a Liberal member of the Legislative Assembly of Ontario from 2003 to 2018, representing the riding of Thunder Bay—Atikokan and serving as a cabinet minister in the government of Kathleen Wynne.

Background 
Mauro was educated at Lakehead University teacher's college in Thunder Bay, and worked as a property manager for fourteen years before entering provincial politics. He served as a city councillor on the Thunder Bay City Council from 1997 to 2003, and was a member of the Thunder Bay Hydro board and the Thunder Bay Regional Hospital.

Politics 
In the provincial election of 2003, Mauro was elected as a Liberal in Thunder Bay—Atikokan. He defeated his  New Democrat candidate John Rafferty by over 11,000 votes. In the 2007 election he faced Rafferty again this time by a narrow margin of 50 votes. He was easily re-elected in the 2011, and 2014 elections. In the 2018 election, he lost his seat to New Democrat Judith Monteith-Farrell by just 81 votes.

During his time in government he has served in several Parliamentary Assistant roles assisting ministers including the Minister of Northern Development and Mines (2003–2007, 2011–2013) and the Minister of Natural Resources (2007–2009). On March 25, 2014, Premier Kathleen Wynne appointed Mauro as Minister of Municipal Affairs and Housing. On June 24 after the election she appointed Mauro as the Minister of Natural Resources and Forestry. After fellow cabinet minister Michael Gravelle temporarily stepped aside in February 2017, Mauro also took over his duties as Ministry of Northern Development and Mines on a temporary basis.

In 2004, he announced that the provincial government would be spending almost $1 million to improve Thunder Bay's transportation service. He is also known to favour a return of the spring bear hunt.

Following his defeat in the 2018 provincial election, he announced his candidacy for mayor in the 2018 municipal election. He won that election, and became mayor of the city on December 1, 2018. Mauro did not seek re-election as Mayor in the 2022 municipal elections.

Cabinet positions

Electoral Record

Municipal

Provincial

References

External links 

 Thunder Bay City Council

1957 births
21st-century Canadian politicians
Canadian people of Italian descent
Lakehead University alumni
Living people
Members of the Executive Council of Ontario
Ontario Liberal Party MPPs
Mayors of Thunder Bay